Wilbur Whilt "Wib" Evans (August 5, 1905 - May 31, 1987) was an American actor and singer who performed on the radio, in opera, on Broadway in films and early live television.

Biography
Evans was born in Philadelphia, the son of Walter Percy and Emma Whilt Evans, of Welsh descent. He had a brother, Walter, and a sister, Emma, who died at an early age. As a child, he sang with the Welsh Singing Society of Philadelphia and as a soloist in the choir of the First Unitarian Church in the Germantown section of the city. At Holmes Junior High School, he performed in his first play, Daddy Long Legs. From 1921 to 1925 he attended West Philadelphia High School For Boys.  There he starred in Gilbert and Sullivan's The Mikado as Ko-Ko.

After graduating from high school he was awarded a two-year scholarship at the prestigious Curtis Institute of Music. During his second year at Curtis, in 1927, he entered the first national radio singing contest, the Atwater Kent Foundation National Radio Singing Contest. Out of 50,000 contestants, Evans and Agnes Davis won the top prizes for male and female contestants, Evans won $5,000 in cash and a two-year scholarship for his junior and senior years at Curtis. Some have asserted that Evans and Davis were the 'first American Idols.'  

A baritone, Evans performed in radio early his career. In 1930, he moved to Los Angeles to perform on the radio, in concerts and to try his hand has a performer in the movie-talkie fever that was sweeping the land. Having little financial success, at the age of twenty six he returned to New York in 1931 and his burgeoning radio career. During this time he signed with Columbia Concert Management Agency and its subsidiary Cooperative-Community Concerts Bureau.  They were known for sending out salesmen en masse across the US and Canada, selling a roster of concert series to larger towns- usually a singer, violinist, pianist etc. These community concerts catered usually to the social leaders in each city to promote their awareness of bringing musical culture to their areas.

On May 22 and 23 of 1931, Evans performed the role of the Pirate King to excellent reviews in the Savoy Company's production of Gilbert and Sullivan's The Pirates of Penzance at Philadelphia's famed Academy of Music.  The Savoy Company is currently the oldest theatrical group in the world dedicated to performing the works of Gilbert and Sullivan.  Founded in 1901, and still extant, Savoy's performing membership of dedicated amateurs was formed from Philadelphia society's "blue bloods" and Social Register-types.

Evans again performed with Savoy on May 13 and 14, 1932 as Jack Point in Gilbert and Sullivan's The Yeomen of the Guard, also at Philadelphia's Academy of Music.  Evans attributed his success in this difficult role to director Pacie Ripple who performed in D'Oyly Carte productions directed by Gilbert and Sullivan themselves.  Evans teamed with long-time Savoy member John Steele Williams as Shadbolt for the show's hilarious comic duet which literally became a show stopping number due to the tumultuous applause.

Evans' last appearance with the Savoy Company was in 1936, again at the Academy of Music.  This was Savoy's first performance of Utopia, Limited was also Philadelphia's premier of this show and one of the earliest performances of this Gilbert and Sullivan opera in the United States.  He again was directed by Pacie Ripple and again drew rave reviews from the Philadelphia press.

Appearing in Canada and every state in the union “except North Dakota” in concerts, operas, recitals, oratorios. He made his grand opera debut in 1933 in Tristan und Isolde with Fritz Reiner and the Philadelphia Symphony Orchestra. Over the next few years, he appeared throughout North America in concerts, operas, recitals and oratorios.  He also served for two years in the Marine Reserve during the 1930s.  In the early 1940s, he starred on Broadway in The Merry Widow, The New Moon, La Vie Parisienne, Mexican Hayride and Up in Central Park.

In 1951, Evans co-starred with Mary Martin in the original London production of South Pacific.  In the early 1950s, Evans and wife Susanna Foster performed in operettas and musicals, touring extensively.  He appeared in By the Beautiful Sea on Broadway in 1954, and his last role on Broadway was in Man of La Mancha (1965).  He also appeared in Man of La Mancha at the Mastbaum Theater in Philadelphia in 1966.  Through the 1950s and 1960s, he also performed in concerts and cabarets.

Evans was married four times, including to actress Susanna Foster from 1948 to 1956, with whom he had two children, Philip and Michael.  His fourth wife was the former Masako Ogura.

Evans died at his home in Mullica Hill, New Jersey at the age of 81.

Musicals
The Merry Widow (1942 revival)
The New Moon (1942 revival)
La Vie Parisienne (1942 revival)
Mexican Hayride (1944)
Up in Central Park (1945)
South Pacific (1951 London production)
By the Beautiful Sea (1954)
Man of La Mancha (1965)

Films
Her First Romance (1940)
The Million Pound Note (1953)

Musical Recordings
The Desert Song (Decca Records, 1944) with Kitty Carlisle and Felix Knight
The Red Mill (Decca, 1945) with Eileen Farrell and Felix Knight

Television
Musical Comedy Time
 The Chocolate Soldier (1950)
 The Merry Widow (1950)
Lost in Space
The Keeper (Part I) (1966)
The Keeper (Part II) (1966)

Notes

References
Appelbaum, Stanley and James Camner (eds.), Stars of the American Musical Theater in Historic Photographs, New York, 1981

External links
 
 
 Photos of Evans with Martin and Foster
 Numerous photos and information about Evans and Foster

1905 births
1987 deaths
People from Harrison Township, New Jersey
American male musical theatre actors
Male actors from Philadelphia
Musicians from Philadelphia
Curtis Institute of Music alumni
American operatic baritones
American people of Welsh descent
20th-century American male actors
20th-century American male opera singers
Singers from Pennsylvania
Classical musicians from Pennsylvania
Singers from New Jersey
Classical musicians from New Jersey